Märwil railway station is a railway station in the village of Märwil, within the municipality of Affeltrangen, in the Swiss canton of Thurgau. It is an intermediate stop on the standard gauge Wil–Kreuzlingen line of THURBO.

Services 
The following services stop at Märwil:

 St. Gallen S-Bahn : half-hourly service from Wil to Romanshorn.

References

External links 
 
 

Railway stations in the canton of Thurgau
THURBO stations